Günther Lanzinger (born 4 January 1972) is an Austrian ice hockey player. He competed in the men's tournaments at the 1994 Winter Olympics and the 2002 Winter Olympics.

References

1972 births
Living people
Austrian ice hockey players
Olympic ice hockey players of Austria
Ice hockey players at the 1994 Winter Olympics
Ice hockey players at the 2002 Winter Olympics
Sportspeople from Villach